The 2011 Big 12 Conference football season was the 16th season for the Big 12, as part of the 2011 NCAA Division I FBS football season. It had 10 football teams due to the departure of Colorado to the Pac-12 and Nebraska to the Big Ten. It was also the last Big 12 season for Texas A&M and Missouri, as both of them departed for the SEC in July 2012.

Rankings

References

External links